Charles Theodore Seltman PhD  (4 August 1886 – 28 June 1957) was an English art historian and writer particularly in the area of numismatics.

Charles Seltman was born in Paddington, London, England on 4 August 1886 to Ernest John Seltman and Barbara Smith Watson from Edinburgh, Scotland. He was educated at Berkhamsted School and during World War I served in the Suffolk Regiment in France. He married Isabel May Griffiths Dane (1893 - 1935), niece of Sir Louis Dane, on 6 June 1917 and in 1918 was accepted into Cambridge University where he specialized in archaeology. He was awarded the medal of the Royal Numismatic Society in 1945.

He is known for his theory that authoritarian societies produce abstract art while free societies produce realistic art.

He was a fellow of Queens' College, Cambridge and a University Lecturer in Classics; he was awarded an honorary degree of Doctor of Literature (Litt.D.).

His wife is buried at the Parish of the Ascension Burial Ground in Cambridge, Cambridgeshire. He died on 28 June 1957, in Cambridge, and was cremated in Cambridge Crematorium on 1 July 1957.  In accordance with his wishes, his ashes were scattered in the Mediterranean Sea near Majorca, Spain.

Works
 The Temple Coins of Olympia, Greece, 1921
 Eros: In Early Attic Legend & Art, 1923
 Athens, Its History & Coinage before the Persian Invasion, 1924
 The Cambridge Ancient History, Volumes of Plates, I-V (Cambridge: University Press, 1927–1939). Vol. I, Vol. II, Vol. III, Vol. IV, Vol. V
 Attic Vase Painting Martin Classical Lectures, Volume III, 1933
 Masterpieces of Greek Coinage, 1946
 Greek Art, 1947, with Chittenden, Jacqueline
 Approach to Greek Art, 1948
 A Pictorial History of the Queens' College, Cambridge 1448–1948, with Browne, A.D, 1948
 A Book of Greek Coins, 1952
 The Twelve Olympians, Gods and Goddesses of Greece, 1952
 Greek Coins, 1955
 Women in Antiquity, 1956
 Wine in the Ancient World, 1957
 Riot in Ephesus; Writings on the Heritage of Greece, 1958

References

External links

Alumni of Queens' College, Cambridge
1886 births
1957 deaths
British Army personnel of World War I
Suffolk Regiment soldiers
People educated at Berkhamsted School
Fellows of Queens' College, Cambridge
20th-century English historians
People from Paddington
Military personnel from London